The Diocese of Abakaliki is a Roman Catholic diocese with its headquarters in Abakaliki, Nigeria. It was erected  on 1 March 1973 from the territory of the Diocese of Ogoja with the Right Reverend Thomas McGettrick SPS as its first bishop.

There is also a Bishop and Diocese of Abakaliki in the Anglican Church of Nigeria.

Bishops

Ordinaries
Thomas McGettrick, S.P.S. (1973–1983)
Michael Nnachi Okoro (1983–2021)
Peter Nworie Chukwu (2021–present)

Auxiliary Bishop
Michael Nnachi Okoro (1977–1983), appointed Bishop here

External links
Diocese of Abakaliki / catholic- hierarchy.com
Roman Catholic Diocese of Abakaliki official website
GCatholic.org page for this diocese

References

Roman Catholic dioceses in Nigeria
Christian organizations established in 1973
Roman Catholic dioceses and prelatures established in the 20th century
1973 establishments in Nigeria
Roman Catholic Ecclesiastical Province of Onitsha